Obsessive Love is a 1984 TV movie starring Yvette Mimieux, who co-wrote the story and produced the film as well.

Cast
Yvette Mimieux
Simon MacCorkindale

Production
"There are few enough films going these days," she said, "and there are three or four women who are offered all the good parts. Of course I could play a lot of awful parts that are too depressing to contemplate.... [Television is] not the love affair I have with film, but television can be a playground for interesting ideas. I love wild, baroque, slightly excessive theatrical ideas, and because television needs so much material, there's a chance to get some of those odd ideas done." 

The film was Mimieux's idea. She based it on John Hinckley and thought it would be interesting if the sexes were reversed.

Mimieux said the network "felt people wouldn't believe me as this woman. They said to me, 'She's a loner, and she shouldn't be attractive.' I asked them, 'Are you saying that only unattractive people can be crazy or lonely or have unfulfilled lives?'" She also pushed against over explaining her character's condition. "I prefer simply looking at the character, following her, seeing her intensity, her passion, her single-mindedness and her intelligence. To do a thumbnail psychological sketch was not what I wanted. That's the kind of thing they love to do on television so everybody understands everything, but in life we don't always understand everything. Even an analyst may not understand the person after years of analysis."

References

External links
Obsessive Love at IMDb

1984 films
Films about stalking